The Bend Group is a geologic group in Texas. It preserves fossils dating back to the Carboniferous period.

See also

 List of fossiliferous stratigraphic units in Texas
 Paleontology in Texas

References
 

Carboniferous Texas